Sanne Boomhouwer (born 8 April 1984 in Aalsmeer, Netherlands), who performs as Susana, is a Dutch trance music vocalist, songwriter and radio host.

Early years 
Boomhouwer grew up in the Amsterdam suburb of Aalsmeer and took classical singing lessons in her youth. She attended the De Brug primary school. Boomhouwer was inspired to become a songwriter after hearing Alanis Morissette's Jagged Little Pill; other inspirations include Mariah Carey and Tori Amos. As a teenager she sang in the rock band '010?, named after the classroom the band rehearsed in.

Career 
At age 19, a neighbor of Boomhouwer's introduced her to producers Raz Nitzan and Adrian Broekhuyse after seeing her perform live. The meeting led to her singing on "Dark Side of the Moon", a collaboration with Dutch producers Ernesto van der Meij and Edwin Koelewijn (credited as Ernesto vs. Bastian). Under the name "Susana", Boomhouwer provided guest vocals on the song "Shivers" by Armin van Buuren; the album of the same title reached the charts in the Netherlands.

Susana then signed with Armada Music. She released her solo debut, Closer, on Armada in 2010, followed by Brave in 2012. She contributed vocals to "Without You" by Egyptian trance duo Aly & Fila, and performed the song live at the pyramids of Giza in 2015. She has also provided guest vocals for Metropole Orchestra at the Tomorrowland Festival and for Rex Mundi.

Susana hosts two radio shows in which she showcases trance music, V2V and Press Play.

She won the Trance Podium Award for Best Vocalist five years in a row from 2014 to 2018.

She has ten songs listed in the top 1000 trance songs of all time, published by A State of Trance in 2021 and provided vocals for the #1 song "Shivers" and the #10 song "RAMelia". She appeared in-studio with Armin van Buuren during the ASOT 1000 broadcast, accepted an award from Armin, and performed "Shivers" live.

On September 2, 2021, she appeared in-studio with Armin Van Buuren during the ASOT 1032 broadcast in celebration of the release of his album "A State of Trance Forever". She performed their song "Home with You" live, which he included in the album as an homage to "Shivers".

In late 2021 she debuted her own record label, Susa Records.

Discography

Albums

EPs

Singles and Collaborations

Songwriter credits per the BMI Songview database.

References

External links 
 Official Website

1984 births
Living people
Armada Music artists
Dance-pop musicians
Dutch house musicians
Dutch trance musicians
Electro house musicians
Eurodance musicians
Musicians from North Holland
Progressive house musicians
Musicians from South Holland
People from Aalsmeer
People from Leiden
Leiden University alumni